Raul Belens Jungmann Pinto (born 3 April 1952 in Recife) is a Brazilian business consultant and politician. He served as minister of agrarian development under former president Fernando Henrique Cardoso and federal deputy for the state of Pernambuco. He was the Minister of Defence from May 2016 to February 2018, appointed by then-acting president Michel Temer. On 27 February 2018, Jungmann was confirmed as Minister of the Public Security.

References

|-

|-

|-

|-

1952 births
Cidadania politicians
Brazilian Communist Party politicians
Brazilian Democratic Movement politicians
Living people
Politicians from Recife
Government ministers of Brazil
Brazilian people of German descent
Defence ministers of Brazil